Oakey railway station is located on the Western line in Queensland, Australia. It serves the town of Oakey. The station has one platform with a passing loop and two sidings, opening in 1868.

In addition to it being used as an operational passenger railway station, the Oakey Railway Station is utilized by the Toowoomba Regional Council as the Oakey Visitor Information Centre.

Services
Oakey is served by Queensland Rail Travel's twice weekly Westlander service travelling between Brisbane and Charleville.

References

External links

Oakey station Queensland's Railways on the Internet

Darling Downs
Railway stations in Australia opened in 1868
Regional railway stations in Queensland
Western railway line, Queensland